Patjarr (also known as Karilywara) is a small Aboriginal community, located near the Clutterbuck Hills between Lake Cobb and Lake Newell, 243 kilometres by road north west of Warburton in the Goldfields–Esperance region of Western Australia.

Demographics 
When enumerated in the 2011 Census of Population and Housing, the population of Patjarr was 41. While no further demographic details are available from the 2011 census, 84% of residents in 2006 identified themselves as being of Indigenous descent. Most of Patjarr's Aboriginal residents are part of the Pintupi group. At the time of the 2006 Census, the Indigenous population profile of Patjarr was skewed, with a sex ratio of 1.0 male per 2.2 females.

History 
The Pintupi began returning to their homelands near Patjarr in 1979 with a view to setting up a permanent outstation. While the community's governing body, Patjarr Aboriginal Corporation, was incorporated under the Aboriginal Councils and Associations Act 1976 on 28 April 1980, it was not until 1993 that the community and its surrounds were excised from the Gibson Desert Nature Reserve and leased to the traditional owners by the Aboriginal Lands Trust. Native title was determined to exist in 2005, as part of the Stanley Mervyn, Adrian Young, and Livingston West and Ors, on behalf of the Peoples of the Ngaanyatjarra Lands v Western Australia and Ors claim.

Town planning 
Patjarr Layout Plan No.2 has been prepared in accordance with State Planning Policy 3.2 Aboriginal Settlements. Layout Plan No.2 was endorsed by the community on 10 October 2008.

Notable people
Pulpurru Davies lives and paints in Patjarr.

Notes

Towns in Western Australia
Shire of Ngaanyatjarraku
Aboriginal communities in Goldfields-Esperance